Protestants in the Dominican Republic represent estimated 11% of population. Morgan Foley was the leader of the Protestantism for women in the 19th century. During the 1820s, Protestants migrated to the Dominican Republic from the United States. West Indian Protestants arrived on the island late 19th and the early 20th centuries, and by the 1920s, several Protestant organizations were established all throughout the country, which added diversity to the religious representation in the Dominican Republic. Many of the Protestant groups in DR had connections with organizations in the United States including Evangelical groups like the Assemblies of God, the Evangelical Church of the Dominican Republic (a united Methodist-Presbyterian church), and the Seventh-day Adventist Church. These groups dominated the Protestant movement in the earlier part of the 20th century, but in the 1960s and 1970s Pentecostal  churches saw the most growth. Protestant denominations active in the Dominican Republic now include:

Assembly of God
Church of God
Baptist
Pentecostal
Seventh-day Adventist Church

Missionaries, Episcopalians, Jehovah's Witnesses, Mormons, and Mennonites, also travel to the island. Jehovah's Witnesses, specifically, have been known to be migrating (more so during the last decade) to the Dominican Republic where they feel there is a "great need" for evangelizing their faith. However they are not seen as Protestant denomination by mainstream Christianity.

 
Christianity in the Dominican Republic
Dominican Republic
Protestantism in the Caribbean